{|

{{Infobox ship characteristics
|Hide header=
|Header caption=
|Ship class=Admiralty modified W-class destroyer
|Ship displacement=1,140 tons standard, 1,550 tons full
|Ship length=  o/a,  p/p
|Ship beam= 
|Ship draught= ,  under full load
|Ship propulsion=*As built 1920:
3 × Yarrow type Water-tube boilers, Brown-Curtis geared steam turbines, 2 shafts, 30,000 shp
LRE conversion 1943
2 × Yarrow type Water-tube boilers, Brown-Curtis geared steam turbines, 2 shafts, 24,000 shp
| Ship speed=*As built 1920:
32 kn
1943 LRE conversion
24.5 kn
| Ship range=*320-370 tons oil
3,500 nmi at 15 kn
900 nmi at 32 kn
| Ship complement= 127
|Ship sensors=*After 1943 LRE conversion: Type 271 target indication radar
Type 291 air warning radar
|Ship EW=
|Ship armament=*As built 1920:
4 × BL 4.7 in (120-mm) Mk.I guns, mount P Mk.I
2 × QF 2 pdr Mk.II "pom-pom" (40 mm L/39)
6 × 21-inch Torpedo Tubes
1943 LRE conversion:3 × BL 4.7 in (120mm) Mk.I L/45 guns
1 ×  AA gun
2 × QF 2 pdr Mk.II "pom-pom" (40 mm L/39)
2 × 20mm Oerlikon cannons
3 ×  torpedo tubes (triple mount)
2 × depth charge racks
Hedgehog anti-submarine mortar
|Ship armour=
|Ship aircraft=
|Ship notes=
}}
|}

HMS Verity was an Admiralty modified W-class destroyer built for the Royal Navy. She was the first ship to carry the name Verity. She was ordered in January 1918 from John Brown & Company of Clydebank with the 13th Order for Destroyers of the Emergency War Program of 1918–19.

Construction
HMS Veritys keel was laid on 17 May 1918 at the John Brown & Company Shipyard in Clydebank, Scotland. She was launched on 19 March 1919. She had a displacement of 1,140 tons standard and up to 1,550 full load.

She was propelled by three Yarrow type water tube boilers powering Brown-Curtis geared steam turbines developing 27,000 shp driving two screws for a maximum designed speed of 34 knots. She was oil-fired and had a fuel capacity of 320 to 350 tons. This gave a range of between 3500 nautical miles at 15 knots to 900 nautical miles at 32 knots.

She shipped four BL 4.7 in (120-mm) Mk.I guns, mount P Mk.I naval guns in four single centre-line turrets. The turrets were disposed as two forward and two aft in super imposed firing positions. She also carried two QF 2 pdr Mk.II "pom-pom" (40 mm L/39) mounted abeam between funnels. Abaft of the second funnel, she carried six 21-inch Torpedo Tubes mounted in pairs on the centre-line.

Inter-War period
Commissioned into the Royal Navy on 17 September 1919, she was assigned to the 1st Destroyer Flotilla of the Atlantic Fleet with pennant number D63. She spent the later part of the 20s and the early 30s in the Mediterranean. In 1938 the ship was assigned to the Local Flotilla based at Portsmouth.

Second World War
October saw her transferred to the 19th Destroyer Flotilla at Harwich for East Coast convoy defence until December.

HMS Verity was assigned to assist in the Evacuation of Dunkirk in 1940. She came under fire from shore batteries near Calais and suffered casualties.

She remained in the area after the evacuation as a convoy escort, and was attacked on 14 August by six Kriegsmarine trawlers and three E-boats. Two of the German ships were sunk in the resulting engagement.

North Africa
Operation Torch, the invasion of Axis controlled Africa, started in 1942. HMS Verity was assigned to escort military convoys in preparation of this attack. She supported the landings at Oran, during which she helped rescue troops from the stricken troopship Strathallan, which  had torpedoed. Only 11 were killed in the attack, which was carrying more than 5,000 officers, men and crew. Strathallan'' sank nearly 22 hours after the torpedo hit.

Notes

Bibliography

External links
 uboat.net
 HMS Verity, Destroyer

 

V and W-class destroyers of the Royal Navy
Ships built on the River Clyde
1919 ships
World War II destroyers of the United Kingdom